William Evan Kovacic (born 1952) is an American legal scholar who served as a commissioner of the Federal Trade Commission (FTC) from 2006 to 2011, including as its chairman from 2008 to 2009. He is a member of the Republican Party.

Kovacic is currently a professor at George Washington University Law School, where he serves as director of their Competition Law Center.

Early life and education
Kovacic's father was a chemical engineer who worked for the U.S. Department of Energy in Washington, D.C. Kovacic graduated from the University of Detroit Jesuit High School in 1970. He then attended Princeton University, graduating in 1974 with a Bachelor of Arts (B.A.) in public and international affairs. 

After college, Kovacic spent one year on the staff of the Senate Committee on the Judiciary Subcommittee on Antitrust and Monopoly. He then attended Columbia Law School, graduating in 1978 with a Juris Doctor degree  as a Harlan Fiske Stone Scholar.

Career
From 1979 to 1983, Kovacic served as a staffer within the FTC, first within the Bureau of Competition's Planning Office and later as an attorney and advisor to then-Commissioner George W. Douglas. After leaving the FTC in 1983, Kovacic became an associate at the Washington, D.C., office of international law firm Bryan Cave. At Bryan Cave, Kovacic practiced in the firm's antitrust and government contracts departments.

In 1986, Kovacic joined the faculty of the George Mason University Law School (now Antonin Scalia Law School), where he taught antitrust law. In 1999, Kovacic became E.K. Gubin Professor of Government Contracts Law at George Washington University (GWU) Law School. In 2001, Kovacic rejoined the FTC's staff as the agency's general counsel, serving until 2004.

In 2006, President George W. Bush appointed Kovacic to replace Orson Swindle as a member of the FTC. On March 30, 2008, Kovacic was designated by Bush to serve as FTC Chair, replacing Deborah Platt Majoras. Following the election of Democrat Barack Obama, he was replaced in this capacity after less than a year in office. On March 2, 2009, Democrat Jon Leibowitz replaced him as FTC Chair.

Following his term at the FTC, Kovacic returned to the GWU Law School where he teaches antitrust, contracts, and government contracts. Kovacic currently serves as the Director of the Competition Law Center at GWU Law School.

International advising 
Since 1992, Kovacic has served as an adviser on antitrust and consumer protection issues to the governments of Armenia, Benin, Egypt, El Salvador, Georgia, Guyana, Indonesia, Kazakhstan, Mongolia, Morocco, Nepal, Panama, Russia, Ukraine, Vietnam, and Zimbabwe. Kovacic also serves on the International Committee of the Institute of Competition Law.

Kovacic was appointed as a Non-Executive Director to the U.K. Competition and Markets Authority (CMA) on July 15, 2013. Kovacic is also a visiting professor at the Dickson Poon School of Law at King's College, London.

Personal life 
Kovacic lives in Virginia, with his wife Kathryn Fenton, an antitrust attorney.

See also
US antitrust law
EU competition law
 List of former FTC commissioners

References

External links

Living people
Princeton University alumni
Columbia Law School alumni
George Washington University Law School faculty
Lawyers who have represented the United States government
Federal Trade Commission personnel
University of Detroit Jesuit High School and Academy alumni
George W. Bush administration personnel
Obama administration personnel
1952 births